The 1989–90 New Mexico State Aggies men's basketball team represented New Mexico State University in the 1989–90 college basketball season. This was Neil McCarthy's 5th season as head coach. The Aggies played their home games at Pan American Center and competed in the Big West Conference. They finished the season 26–5, 16–2 in Big West play to earn a share of the conference regular season title. They earned an at-large bid to the NCAA tournament, but fell in the first round to Loyola Marymount, 111–92.

Roster

Schedule and results

|-
!colspan=9 style=| Regular season

|-
!colspan=9 style=|Big West tournament

|-
!colspan=9 style=|NCAA tournament

Rankings

References

New Mexico State
New Mexico State
New Mexico State Aggies men's basketball seasons
Aggies
Aggies